The Lambda Literary Awards (also known as the "Lammys") are awarded yearly by the US-based Lambda Literary Foundation to published works that celebrate or explore LGBT (lesbian, gay, bisexual, transgender) themes. The organization is considered to be one of the main promoters of new and emerging LGBT writers.

The Lambda Literary Award for Children's and Young Adult Literature, one of the Lammys 25 awards, was introduced during the 2nd Lambda Literary Awards, when it was called "Young Adult/Children’s Book Award". After not being present in the 1991 ceremonies, the award returned in the 4th edition under the name "Children's/Young Adult Literature". Starting in 2007, it has been known as the "LGBTQ Children's/Young Adult" award.

The 25th Lambda Literary Awards had a record number of submissions at the time. Due to the increased number of books submitted for evaluation, the judges of every category were encouraged to submit more finalists. After that, and since the 26th edition, if the number of submissions is high enough, the Children's/Young Adult category is divided in two subcategories, "Children's/Middle Grade" and "Young Adult", which happened in the 2020 and 2021 editions.

Recipients 
David Levithan has won the award a total of three times, in 2004, 2007 and 2014, and was nominated another three times. Jacqueline Woodson has been awarded two Lammys in this category, in 1996 and 1998. As of 2020, Kacen Callender, which published This Is Kind of an Epic Love Story and Hurricane Child both in 2018, is the only author to have two nominations for the same year. Hurricane Child was also the winner on that same year.

References 

Children's and Young Adult
Lists of LGBT-related award winners and nominees
Children's literary awards
English-language literary awards
LGBT young adult literature